The Church Street drill hall is a former military installation in Brighton. It is a Grade II listed building.

History
The building was designed by Edmund Scott as the headquarters of the 1st Volunteer Battalion, The Royal Sussex Regiment and was completed in 1890. This unit evolved to become the 6th (Cyclist) Battalion, The Royal Sussex Regiment but moved to Montpelier Place in Brighton before the First World War.

Meanwhile, the Sussex Imperial Yeomanry had been located at the Church Street drill hall from their re-formation in 1901. The regiment was mobilised at the drill hall in August 1914 before being deployed to Gallipoli and, ultimately, to the Western Front. After the First World War, the unit converted to artillery and was reduced to battery size, becoming 389 (Sussex Yeomanry) Battery, the 98th (Sussex Yeomanry) Brigade, Royal Field Artillery.

After the Second World War, the battery was reformed as P Battery, 344th (Sussex Yeomanry) Light Anti-Aircraft and Searchlight Regiment, Royal Artillery and then as P Battery, 258th (Sussex Yeomanry) Light Anti-Aircraft Regiment, Royal Artillery in 1955. After the defence cut-backs of 1967, the drill hall was decommissioned and became a Royal Mail sorting office and, more recently, it has been used as an antiques warehouse.

See also
Grade II listed buildings in Brighton and Hove: P–R

References

Drill halls in England
Buildings and structures in East Sussex
Grade II listed buildings in Brighton and Hove